Lisa Elena Jane Mason (born 26 February 1982 in Aylesbury, England) is a British gymnast who has competed for her country at the Commonwealth Games (for England), European championships, World championships and the Olympic Games. She was the vault champion at the 1998 Commonwealth Games, and was part of the first Great Britain women's artistic gymnastic team to qualify for the team event at the Olympic Games.

Having retired aged 18 in 2001, Mason unusually made a very successful elite comeback aged 31, winning numerous national titles and being invited to World trials for the Great Britain team, despite that teams ranking having improved dramatically in the years since her first retirement.

In 2020 Mason, with fellow gymnast Catherine Lyons went public with allegations of serious physical and mental abuse within the British Gymnastics system In response several elite and former elite gymnasts came forward, corroborating Lyons and Mason's allegations in their own careers, including European champions Becky Downie and Ellie Downie and Olympic medallist Amy Tinkler . Later that year, British Gymnastics CEO Jane Allen resigned from her role, though denied her resignation was linked to the Lyons and Mason interviews and their fallout.

Gymnastics career
Lisa Mason began training at Huntingdon Gym Club at the age of five. She has represented her country at three European championships and world championships events, Commonwealth Games and Olympic Games. She represented England and won a gold medal in the vault and also won a silver medal in the team event, at the 1998 Commonwealth Games in Kuala Lumpur.

She was the first British gymnast to make finals in European and World Championships. In Tianjin she earned the highest ever placing in the All-Around for a British Gymnast in the World Championships, also helping Great Britain take the first-ever full team to the Olympic Games.

On the domestic scene, she has been a British gymnastic champion on three occasions, her first title being won at the age of 14, making her the youngest ever gymnast to win the senior title. Her worst noteworthy injury was when she broke her arm in 1995 at the junior British championships after falling off the uneven bars. During the resulting surgery, she had two plates and twelve bolts inserted in the injury. Six months later, she returned to claim the title of senior British champion. She then defended that title twice consecutively, a first for any gymnast. Lisa was the first British gymnast to ever win gold at a Grand Prix event. In 1998 she won the Cottbus floor title ahead of Russia's Yelena Produnova and Svetlana Khorkina. She also won medals on the circuit on floor, Beam and Vault events. She was awarded the title of "Master Gymnast" by British Gymnastics.

In January 2013, after 12 years away from the sport, Lisa announced her comeback with her aim being to qualify for the Glasgow 2014 Commonwealth Games. In March 2013 in her first come back competition and after five months of training, Lisa was crowned English vault champion and finished 4th in the finals at the national British championships. Lisa went on to compete at the English and British championships the following year picking up a collection of medals on vault and floor and finishing top 8 on both beam and bars.

Personal life 
Lisa is involved in gymnastics as a coach and a choreographer and is also a stunt double and sports model. She is known for her outlandish gymnastics attire. In 2020, following the gymnastics abuse revelations in the press Mason talked about the dark side of British sport, in order to encourage fellow sufferers.

References

External links 

Lisa Mason at Gymn Forum
British Gymnastics "Master Gymnast" Status
Biography
https://www.pressboxonline.com/2016/10/18/ravens-cb-will-davis-former-uk-gymnast-lisa-mason-share-21st-century-love
 
 
 

1982 births
Living people
British female artistic gymnasts
Gymnasts at the 2000 Summer Olympics
Gymnasts at the 1998 Commonwealth Games
Sportspeople from Aylesbury
Olympic gymnasts of Great Britain
Commonwealth Games gold medallists for England
Commonwealth Games silver medallists for England
Commonwealth Games medallists in gymnastics
Medallists at the 1998 Commonwealth Games